Baiquan Subdistrict is a subdistrict situated inside of Yanqing District, Beijing, China. It borders Rulin and Xiangshuiyuan Subdistricts to its north, Dayushu Town to its east and south, and exclaves of Yanqing Town to its east, west and south. In 2020, its total population was 36,013.

The subdistrict was established in 2009 from part of Yanqing Town. It was named after Baiquan Street within it.

Geography 
The subdistrict is bounded by Guishui River to its north. Yankang Road, which is part of the larger G234 Xingyang Road, passes through this region.

Administrative divisions 
Below is a list of the 9 communities that Baiquan Subdistrict was consisted of in 2021:

See also 

 List of township-level divisions of Beijing

References 

Subdistricts of Beijing
Yanqing District